Julie-Ann Campbell is an Australian lawyer and trade unionist who currently serves as the Secretary of the Queensland branch of the Australian Labor Party.

She previously served as President of the UQ Union during 2007 and later graduated with degrees in Law and Arts (Hons). Julie-Ann was admitted to the Supreme Court of Queensland in 2012, was a policy advisor in the Queensland Government and Industrial Officer at the Australian Manufactoring Workers Union (AMWU).

Previously the party's Vice President, Campbell is the first woman to become secretary, the party's most senior executive position.

As a branch member of the ALP in 2013, Ms Campbell also moved a motion (which was subsequently ratified) at Labor's annual conference that the Labor Parliamentary Leader be elected by rank and file members.

References

Australian Labor Party politicians
Living people
Australian women in politics
Year of birth missing (living people)